Curse of Dragor is a 1995 fantasy role playing video game for the Macintosh, developed by Banshee Software and published by Domark.

Gameplay
The game has many features in common with other dungeon crawlers of its type. Players are first tasked with creating a party of four characters from a variety of classes, each with its own strengths and weaknesses. The plot involves a group of adventurers seeking to free the land of Xorinth from the curse laid upon it by the evil Prince Dragor. Battles take place in real-time (as opposed to turn-based combat) with a set number of experience points awarded for each monster slain. Additional experience can also be gained by solving the various puzzles scattered throughout the game. As the characters level up, their abilities improve, and they will be able to equip stronger weapons.

Reception

Next Generation reviewed the Macintosh version of the game, rating it two stars out of five, and stated that "Once you're past the game itself (unfortunately, we mean it) Curse is an impressive product.  Graphics, sound, and control are all excellent, and the game has enough twists and turns to keep a player who does like the basic nature of the product playing for hours.  In the end, while it's by no means a bad game, Curse of Dragor is a holdover from a genre that has run out of steam." Writing for PC Games, Steve Klett concluded, "[I]f you have the patience, Curse of Dragor brings a compelling fantasy experience to a Macintosh world without many role-playing options." The Macintosh Bible recommended Curse of Dragor to "very serious role-players" due to its combination of intuitive interface and challenging gameplay.

Reviews
Mac Game Gate (1999)

References

External links
Official site (archived)

1995 video games
Classic Mac OS games
Classic Mac OS-only games
Domark games
Video games developed in the United Kingdom